Tommaso Morlino (26 August 1925 – 6 May 1983) was an Italian politician.

Early life and career
Born in Irsina to the notary Giovan Battista Morlino of Avigliano and Silvia Scardaccione, he was an orphan little more than a teenager and went to live in Sant'Arcangelo, where he grew up in his mother's house.

His mother, Silvia Scardaccione, was the daughter of Giuseppe Scardaccione di Sant'Arcangelo. To the same family belonged Decio Scardaccione, brother of his mother, economist, agronomist and university professor, as well as one of the leading Lucanian exponents of Christian Democracy; Morlino had a close relationship with him throughout his political career. He graduated in law and political science and in 1948 he entered the roles of the State Advocacy, where he covered his entire career, until he became, in 1951, Deputy Advocate General.

Political career
He was Senator of the Republic from 1968 until his death, in 1983. He also served as Undersecretary for the Budget from 1973 to 1974, Minister for Regional affairs from 1974 to 1976, Minister of Budget and Economic Planning from 1976 to 1979, Minister of Justice from 1979 to 1980 and President of the Senate from 1982 to 1983.

In the Christian Democracy, Morlino was a Moroteo, that is a member of the faction headed by Aldo Moro.

References

|-

|-

|-

1925 births
1983 deaths
People from Irsina
Christian Democracy (Italy) politicians
Government ministers of Italy
Presidents of the Italian Senate
Senators of Legislature V of Italy
Senators of Legislature VI of Italy
Senators of Legislature VII of Italy
Senators of Legislature VIII of Italy
Politicians of Basilicata
Italian Ministers of Justice